NatiVita is an international research and manufacturing pharmaceutical company, it is situated in Beshankovichy urban settlement, Vitebsk region, Belarus. NatiVita is the first company in Belarus, that started developing and producing biopharmaceutical medicines based on monoclonal antibodies using target cell therapy for specific genetic diseases such as Breast cancer, Lung cancer, Myeloma. 
The company was established in 2012 with support of AB ZiaValda (Lithuania), «UniPharma» (Slovakia), «NatcoPharma Ltd» (India)

Pharmaceutical producing complex 

Pharmaceutical producing complex NatiVita has a full cycle of medicine's production according to the European quality standard GMP

Scientific-research centre 

The International Scientific-research centre Nativita was opened in 2017.

External links 
 News from Belarus: Belarus can take its pharma industry to the next level
 Sharkovshchina Regional Executive Committee: Slovakia takes live interest in pharmaceutical enterprise in Belarusian Beshenkovichi
 Belarus Business News: Lithuanian private sector eyeing Belarusian pharmaceutics with interest

References 

Pharmaceutical companies of Belarus
Belarusian companies established in 2012
Pharmaceutical companies established in 2012